Enneanectes reticulatus, known commonly as the network triplefin, is a species of triplefin blenny from the coastal waters of southern Baja California.

References

reticulatus
Fish described in 1991